Stebnyk is a city in Drohobych Raion in Lviv Oblast (province) of western Ukraine, close to the border with Poland. It is located in the Drohobych municipality. It belongs to Drohobych urban hromada, one of the hromadas of Ukraine. Population: . 

Until 18 July 2020, Stebnyk belonged to Drohobych Municipality. As part of the administrative reform of Ukraine, which reduced the number of raions of Lviv Oblast to seven, Drohobych Municipality was merged into Drohobych Raion.

See also
 TESP (company)

References

Drohobych
Cities in Lviv Oblast
Cities of district significance in Ukraine